The 4th annual Billboard Latin Music Awards which honor the most popular albums, songs, and performers in Latin music took place in Miami.

Pop

Song of the year

 "Amame Una Vez Más", Amanda Miguel

Pop album of the year, Male
"Tango", Julio Iglesias

Pop album of the year, female
"Pies Descalzos", Shakira

Pop album of the year, duo or group
"Macarena Non Stop", Los del Río

Pop album of the year, new artist
"Pies Descalzos", Shakira

Pop video of the year
"Un Poco de Amor", Shakira

Tropical/Salsa

Tropical/salsa song of the year

"Ironía", Frankie Ruiz

Tropical/salsa album of the year, male
"Auténtico", Manny Manuel

Tropical/salsa album of the year, female
"Dicen Que...", Albita

Tropical/salsa album of the year, duo or group
"La Makina...A Mil", La Makina

Tropical/salsa album of the year, new artist
"Dark Latin Groove", DLG

Tropical/salsa video of the year
"Oye Como Va", Tito Puente Jr.

Regional Mexican

Regional Mexican song of the year
"El Príncipe", Grupo Límite

Regional Mexican album of the year, male
"Pedro Fernández", Pedro Fernández

Regional Mexican album of the year, female
"Siempre Selena", Selena

Regional Mexican album of the year, duo or group

"Unidos Para Siempre", Los Tigres del Norte

Regional Mexican album of the year, new artist
"Por Puro Amor", Grupo Límite

Regional Mexican video of the year
"Juan Sabor", La Tropa F

Other awards

Hot latin tracks artist of the year
Enrique Iglesias

Latin rap album of the year
"In Da House", Proyecto Uno

Latin rock album of the year
"Si El Norte Fuera El Sur", Ricardo Arjona

Contemporary Latin jazz album of the year
Jazzin', Tito Puente & La India With Count Basie Orchestra

Latin dance single of the year
"Cuba", El Mariachi

Latin dance album of the year
"Verano 96", Various Artists

Songwriter of the year
Marco Antonio Solís

Publisher of the year
Fonomusic

Publishing corporation of the year
Fonomusic

Producer of the year
Marco Antonio Solís

Spirit Of Hope
Emmanuel

Billboard Lifetime achievement award
Herb Alpert

Billboard Latin Music Hall of Fame
José José

References

Billboard Latin Music Awards
Latin Billboard Music Awards
Latin Billboard Music Awards
Billboard Music Awards
Latin Billboard Music